The C.H.A.M.P.S. Heart of Texas Bowl (known as the HOT Bowl for short) is the name for two annual American football bowl games played in Central Texas.

The first and older of the two HOT Bowls, which has been played since 2001, features two community college teams from the NJCAA, one based in Texas against an at-large opponent. After a two year hiatus, the game returned in 2021 and was staged at Texas A&M-Commerce's Memorial Stadium.

From 2012 to 2018, a second HOT Bowl was played between teams at the NCAA Division II level. The Division II bowl had a conference tie-in with the Lone Star Conference; the LSC's opponent was chosen at-large. During its existence, the contest was one of only four bowl games in NCAA Division II, the other three being the Mineral Water Bowl, the Heritage Bowl, and the Live United Texarkana Bowl.

Founded by Copperas Cove High School football coach Jack Welch, the bowl games were originally played in Copperas Cove until 2017. After his retirement from the district, Waco ISD Stadium in Waco became the host.

The acronym "C.H.A.M.P.S." stands for "Communities Helping Americans Mature, Progress and Succeed," which is a nonprofit group focusing on improving drug and alcohol abuse, bullying, mental health, and preventing teen suicide. An additional title sponsor, TIPS (The Interlocal Purchasing System), made the game known as the TIPS-CHAMPS Heart of Texas Bowl in 2018.

All-time results

NJCAA Bowl contests

NCAA Division II contests

The Lone Star representative in the 2012 game, McMurry, was an independent in its first year of transitioning from NCAA Division III to Division II and LSC membership, and received the bowl bid based on its 7-3 regular-season record (1-1 vs. LSC teams).
The 2013 game between Ouachita Baptist (AR) and Tarleton State (TX) was canceled due to severe winter weather.
The 2018 game between Central Oklahoma  and Angelo State featured a renewed former Lone Star Conference rivalry between two of NCAA Division II’s most storied football programs. Central Oklahoma made a historic 21-point comeback in the second half to win the 2018 title.

References

External links
 

College football bowls
Lone Star Conference football
NJCAA football